Marriott Marquis Chicago is a 39-story hotel near McCormick Place. The hotel has 63 meeting rooms totaling 89,407 square feet of space, and is considered by some as an expansion of McCormick Place, given that the hotel and convention center are connected via an enclosed footbridge.

References 

Marriott hotels
Skyscraper hotels in Chicago
2016 establishments in Illinois
Hotels established in 2016